Canute Peterson (also Knud Peterson) (May 13, 1824 – October 14, 1902) was a Mormon pioneer settler of Utah Territory and was a leader in LDS Church.

Peterson was born in Bergen, Norway. In Norway, he became a member of the Religious Society of Friends and emigrated to the United States in 1837. In 1842, while living in La Salle County, Illinois, he became a member of the LDS Church. After joining the church, he became a missionary to Norwegians living in Wisconsin.

Peterson led a company of Mormon pioneers to the Salt Lake Valley in 1849. He was one of the founders of Lehi in Utah Territory.

From 1853 to 1855, Peterson was a missionary in the Scandinavian Mission, where he preached in Norway and became the president of the Christiana Conference of the church. 

In 1867, Peterson was asked to move to Ephraim, Utah to be a bishop of the church there. Peterson was instrumental in assisting the Latter-day Saints make peace with the Native Americans in Sanpete County. 

On 1882-10-14, Peterson became a member of the Council of Fifty. When Peterson died in Ephraim, Utah, he was serving as the president of the Sanpete Stake, a position he held since 1877. Peterson was also ordained to the office of patriarch.

References
Kate B. Carter (1939–1951). Heart Throbs of the West (Salt Lake City, Utah: Daughters of the Utah Pioneers), 2:303–330
Andrew Jenson. LDS Biographical Encyclopedia (Salt Lake City, Utah: Andrew Jenson History Co.), 1:362–363
"The Story of Canute Peterson," Instructor, Apr. 1946, pp. 174–177

1824 births
1902 deaths
19th-century Mormon missionaries
American city founders
Converts to Mormonism
Mission presidents (LDS Church)
Mormon missionaries in Denmark
Mormon missionaries in Norway
Mormon missionaries in Sweden
Mormon missionaries in the United States
Mormon pioneers
Norwegian emigrants to the United States
Norwegian leaders of the Church of Jesus Christ of Latter-day Saints
Norwegian Mormon missionaries
Patriarchs (LDS Church)
People from Ephraim, Utah
People from Lehi, Utah
Snow College